Gran Glacier is a glacier in Antarctica that flows south into Mackay Glacier between Mount Gran and Mount Woolnough. It rises from a snow divide with Benson Glacier to the northeast. It was named after Mount Gran by the New Zealand Northern Survey Party of the Commonwealth Trans-Antarctic Expedition (1956–58), which visited the area in November 1957.

References

Glaciers of Scott Coast